Overtones is the second album from British electronic music artist Just Jack. The single "Starz in Their Eyes" managed to reach #2 in the UK. The US edition of the album includes a reworked version of "I Talk Too Much" featuring Kylie Minogue.

Track listing
All songs were written by Jack Allsopp except where noted.
"Writer's Block" – 3:42
"Glory Days" – 3:39
"Disco Friends" – 3:00
"Starz in Their Eyes" – 4:55
"Lost" (Allsopp, Ralph Lamb, Andrew Ross) – 5:48
"I Talk Too Much" (Allsopp, Ali Love) – 3:50 (US feat. Kylie Minogue), 4:16 (UK)
"Hold On" (Allsopp, Adam Phillips) – 2:24
"Symphony of Sirens" – 4:21
"Life Stories" – 3:52
"No Time" – 4:27
"Mourning Morning" (Allsopp, Jules Porreca) – 4:06
"Spectacular Failures" – 13:10
"Electrickery" – 7:27 (US bonus track)

Track 12 features the hidden track "Koolaid" beginning at 9:55.

References

Just Jack albums
2007 albums